Nabiha Mhiedly (Arabic: نبيهة محيدلي) is a Lebanese writer who was born in 1962, Beirut, Lebanon. She has published over 100 children stories. Mhiedly is a three-time winner of Etisalat Children's Literature Award as she won the award in 2009, for her book ‘I Love’, in 2012, for ‘The Creatures of The Room Ceiling’, and for ‘Abo Khrkoba’ in 2019.

Biography 
Mhiedly was born in 1962, in Beirut. She holds a B.A. in biology and a B.A. in journalism from Lebanese University. She also holds an M.A. in education from Saint Joseph University. Mhiedly is the editor of two children magazines (i.e. ‘Touta Touta’ and ‘Ahmed’). In 1998, she established ‘Dar Alhadaeq’ which is a publishing house that distributes books and magazines for children. She has won the Etisalat Children's Literature Award three times. The first time was in 2009, 2012, and in 2019 for her books ‘I Love’, ‘The Creatures of The Room Ceiling’, and for ‘Abo Khrkoba’, respectively.

Works 
Mhiedly has published several stories for children, for example:

 Mohtady’s Diaries 1 (Original title: Yaomyat Mohtady 1), 1997
 Ghassan Knows What Pollution Is  (Original title: GhasSan Yaerif Ma Hwa Talwuth), 1999
 How’s The weather? (original title: Kifa Halu Ldjaw?), 2009
 The Story of The Book (Original title: Qissatul Kitab), 2009
 Sadness and Happiness (Original title: Huzen Wa Farah), 2009
 Marmer’s Finger (Original title: Isba’a Maramer), 2010
 The Creatures of Room Ceiling (Original title: Kaenat Saqful Ghourfa), 2011
 I Love (Original title: Ana Oheb), 2011
 Prudence- Caution- Cleverness- Self-confidence (Original title: Alhytta- Alhadar-Addaka’a- Athiqa bel-nnafs), 2011
 Iddher wa Ban.. Alika Alaman, 2012
 Best Stories (Original title: Ahsan Alqisas), 2013
 The Story Behind The Proverb (Original title: Qissat Mathl), 2013

Awards 
The awards that Mhiedly has won are:

 The Arab Journalism Award for ‘Touta Touta’ magazine.
 Etisalat Children's Literature Award for ‘Ana Oheb’, 2009
 Etisalat Children's Literature Award for ‘The Creatures of Ceiling Room’, 2012
 Etisalat Children's Literature Award for ‘Abo Kherkoba’ for best directing, 2019

References 

Lebanese writers
Lebanese women writers
Lebanese women children's writers
1962 births
Living people
Lebanese University alumni